Streptomyces sparsogenes is a bacterium species from the genus of Streptomyces which has been isolated from soil. Streptomyces sparsogenes produces sparsomycine and tubercidin.

See also 
 List of Streptomyces species

References

Further reading

External links
Type strain of Streptomyces sparsogenes at BacDive -  the Bacterial Diversity Metadatabase

sparsogenes
Bacteria described in 1963